Bowkeria is a genus of flowering plants in the family Stilbaceae described as a genus in 1859.

The entire genus is endemic to  South Africa.

Species
 Bowkeria citrina Thode -
  Bowkeria cymosa MacOwan
  Bowkeria verticillata (Eckl. & Zeyh.) Schinz - Natal Shell-flower

References

 
Lamiales genera
Endemic flora of South Africa